Thetidium or Thetidion or Thetideion (Θετίδειον, or Θεστίδειον) was a town in Thessaliotis in ancient Thessaly, close to Pharsalus, where Flamininus encamped at the end of the second march from Pherae towards Scotussa, before the Battle of Cynoscephalae. It derived its name from Thetis, the mother of Achilles, the national hero of the Achaean Phthiotae.

Its site is at a location called Agios Athanasios or Kato Dasolofos, within the boundaries of the modern village of Thetidio, which echoes the ancient name.

References

Populated places in ancient Thessaly
Former populated places in Greece
Thessaliotis